Museum Kampa is a modern art gallery in Prague, Czech Republic, showing Central European, and in particular Czech work. The pieces are from the private collection of Meda Mládek, wife of Jan V. Mládek.
The museum opened in 2003 and is housed in the Sova's Mills on the eastern bank of the Kampa Island on the River Vltava.

There is a large sculpture of a chair by Magdalena Jetelová outside the museum, which is a prominent landmark visible from across the Vltava.

See also
 Babies (Černý)

External links
Museum Kampa website
Radio Praha article on the Jetelová Chair 
Virtual tour of the Museum Kampa provided by Google Arts & Culture

Art museums established in 2003
Museums in Prague
Art museums and galleries in the Czech Republic
Modern art museums
Museum Kampa
21st-century architecture in the Czech Republic